The 2009–10 Union Dutchwomen women's hockey team will represent Union College in the 2009–10 NCAA Division I women's hockey season. The Dutchwomen are a member of the Eastern College Athletic Conference.

Offseason
May 27 : Marianna Locke, a 2009 graduate of St. Lawrence, has been named an assistant coach on Union’s women’s ice hockey team. Locke, also served as a coach for the Adirondack Regional Team at the 2009 Empire State Games, guiding her team to a bronze medal.
June 1: Defenseman Jackie Koetteritz and forward Marissa Gentile will captain the 2009-10 Union College women’s ice hockey squad. Koetteritz will be the only senior on the team.
June 15: The Union College women’s ice hockey team topped ECAC Hockey schools in 2008 raising approximately $11,700 during the “Pink at the Rink” efforts. In 2009, the Dutchwomen raised $4,249.
June 30: Union women's ice hockey head coach Claudia Asano and assistant coach Ali Boe will serve as coaches for the USA Hockey Player Development Camp. Asano will coach the girl's U-16 team camp, while Boe will be coaching the girl's U-14 team camp in Rochester, NY. 
August 12 : The Union women’s ice hockey team will have six new recruits for the 2009-10 season. The group consists of four forwards, one defenseman and one goaltender. Nicole Bartlett, Katie Faucher, Rhianna Kurio, Alana Marcinko, Emma Rambo and Jeannie Sabourin will join the team.

Exhibition

Regular season
The club's overall record was 5 wins, 28 losses and 1 tie. In the ECAC, its conference mark was 1 win, 20 losses and 1 tie. The home record was 4 wins, 12 losses and 1 tie, while the road mark was 1 win, 16 losses and no ties.

On February 20, 2010, senior Jackie Koetteritz, had played in her 125th game for the Dutchwomen, setting a record for the most games in a Dutchwoman uniform.

Standings

Roster

Schedule

Player stats

Skaters

Goaltenders

Awards and honors
Jackie Koetteritz, Alternates for the 2010 Frozen Four Skills Challenge 
Emma Rambo, ECAC Rookie of the Week (Week of October 5)

Team Awards
Jackie Koetteritz, 2010 George Morrison Most Valuable Player award
Jackie Koetteritz, 2010 Hana Yamasita Coaches Award winner
Perri Maduri and Dania Simmonds, 2010 Most Improved Player award (tie) 
Alana Marcinko, 2010 Dutchwomen Rookie of the Year
Kayleigh Melia, 2010 Unsung Hero award
Elsa Perushek, 2010 Ashley Kilstein Community Service Award

References

External links
Official site

Union
Union Dutchwomen ice hockey seasons